John Charles Carney Jr. (born May 20, 1956) is an American politician serving as the 74th governor of Delaware since 2017. He also served as Delaware's secretary of finance from 1996 to 2000. He first unsuccessfully sought the Democratic nomination for governor in 2008, losing to Jack Markell. He ran for governor again in 2016 and won, succeeding Markell, who was term-limited. He was reelected in 2020, defeating Republican Julianne Murray with 59.5% of the vote.

Early life

Carney was born in Wilmington, Delaware, and raised in Claymont, the second of nine children of Ann Marie (née Buckley) and John Charles "Jack" Carney (1925-2014). Both his parents were educators. His great-grandparents immigrated from Ireland. Carney was quarterback of the 1973 state championship St. Mark's High School football team, and earned All-Ivy League and Most Valuable Player honors in football at Dartmouth College, from which he graduated in 1978. At Dartmouth, he joined the local Beta Alpha Omega fraternity. He later coached freshman football at the University of Delaware while earning his master's degree in public administration.

Early political career
Carney has served as Deputy Chief Administrative Officer of New Castle County and as Secretary of Finance and Deputy Chief of Staff for Governor Tom Carper.

Lieutenant governor of Delaware

Carney was elected lieutenant governor of Delaware in 2000 and served from January 16, 2001 until January 20, 2009. As lieutenant governor, he presided over the Delaware State Senate and chaired the Board of Pardons. He also chaired the Delaware Health Care Commission, the Interagency Council on Adult Literacy, the Criminal Justice Council, the Center for Education Technology, and the Livable Delaware Advisory Council. In 2002 he launched the education initiative "Models of Excellence in Education" to identify practices in schools that have raised student achievement. Carney was also selected by other lieutenant governors to chair the National Lieutenant Governors Association from July 2004 to July 2005.

Carney has long been an advocate for wellness issues in Delaware, sponsoring "BeHealthy Delaware" and "The Lt. Governor's Challenge" to encourage Delawareans to be more active and address the state's high rate of chronic disease. He fought for Delaware's public smoking ban to improve health, cut cancer rates, and discourage teens from starting to smoke.

After completing his tenure as lieutenant governor in 2009, Carney served as president and chief operating officer of Transformative Technologies, which is investing in the DelaWind project, to bring offshore wind turbine construction to Delaware. He planned to step down in early 2010 to concentrate on his U.S. House campaign.

U.S. House of Representatives

Elections
2010

Carney was the Democratic nominee for Delaware's at-large seat in the United States House of Representatives in 2010. He faced Republican Glen Urquhart, Independent Party of Delaware nominee Earl R. Lofland, Libertarian Brent A. Wangen, and Blue Enigma Party nominee Jeffrey Brown. The seat had been held since 1993 by Republican Michael Castle, who declined to seek reelection to the House in order to run for the U.S. Senate seat once held by Vice President Joe Biden. In the first week of October, Fairleigh Dickinson University's PublicMind Poll released the results of its opinion research, showing Carney with a 15-point advantage over Urquhart, 51%-36%. Days before the election, a second Fairleigh Dickinson poll showed Carney leading by 17 points, 53% to 36% among likely voters.

Carney won the seat by 16 points, 57%-41%, and took office on January 3, 2011. His victory was one of the three seats Democrats gained in a year when they lost a net 63 seats to the Republicans.

2012

In his bid for a second term, Carney faced Republican Tom Kovach, the president of the New Castle County Council, and two minor candidates. In a debate with Kovach, Carney said, "I will continue to do in Washington what I did in Delaware: work across the aisle to get things done. I learned early on that compromise is part of life." Of the Affordable Care Act (Obamacare), Carney said that it "is not perfect" but that it is the "only chance we have to get costs under control." Carney was reelected in a landslide, with 64% of the vote to Kovach's 33%.

2014

Carney ran for reelection to a third term in 2014. He defeated Republican Rose Izzo, 59% to 37%, with Green nominee Bernie August and Libertarian Scott Gesty taking 2% each.

Tenure
In 2011, Carney and Illinois Republican Aaron Schock co-sponsored a bill that would use U.S. oil exploration to help fund a five-year federal highway construction project.

On April 7, 2014, Carney introduced the Expatriate Health Coverage Clarification Act of 2014 (H.R. 4414; 113th Congress) into the House. The bill would exempt expatriate health care plans from the requirements of the Affordable Care Act. Carney argued that expatriates, a group that includes businessmen, pilots, and ship captains, usually already have special, high-quality health care plans designed to meet their unique needs. Carney said that "expatriate health insurance plans offer high-end, robust coverage to executives and others working outside their home country, giving them access to a global network of health care providers." He indicated that requiring American expatriate health care providers to meet the Affordable Care Act's tax and reporting requirements would put them at an unfair competitive disadvantage in comparison to foreign companies offering similar health care plans.

Committee assignments
Committee on Financial Services
Subcommittee on Capital Markets and Government-Sponsored Enterprises
Subcommittee on Monetary Policy and Trade
Subcommittee on Oversight and Investigations

Governor of Delaware

Elections

2008

Carney sought the Democratic nomination for governor in 2008, as incumbent Governor Ruth Ann Minner was constitutionally barred from seeking a third term. Despite the backing of most of the party establishment, he lost the primary in an upset by fewer than 2,000 votes to State Treasurer Jack Markell, who went on to win the general election.

2016

Carney once again sought the Democratic nomination for governor in 2016, as Markell was constitutionally barred from seeking a third term. Carney won the Democratic primary unopposed and went on to win the general election.

2020

Carney was eligible to seek and won a second term, defeating Republican Julianne Murray in a landslide in the general election, with 59.5% of the vote compared to her 38.6%.

Tenure 
On July 12, 2017, after signing Executive Order 11 to reestablish the Juvenile Justice Advisory Group, Carney said, "The Juvenile Justice Advisory Group will help us create an environment where all Delaware kids have an opportunity to succeed. This Executive Order will recharge and reenergize the group to find solutions that will work." On July 20, Carney vetoed a Delaware House of Representatives bill removing the five-mile radius of Delaware charter schools with enrollment preference and keeping out students in Wilmington, charging it with negatively impacting "some of our most vulnerable students."

On October 13, 2017, in response to President Donald Trump's ending cost-sharing reductions within the American health care system, Carney said the choice would lead to "more people being uninsured in our state, which eventually means increased premiums for all of us" and pledged he would work with the state congressional delegation to return the cost-sharing reductions.

In April 2019, Carney pardoned Barry Croft, a Bear resident who had served a three-year sentence for possessing a gun during the commission of a felony. In October 2020, Croft was arrested and federally charged for his involvement in a kidnapping plot against Michigan Governor Gretchen Whitmer. The day after Croft's arrest, Carney confirmed the pardon, called the federal charges "disturbing", and said, "This is also another warning sign about the growing threat of violence and radicalization in our politics."

On March 12, 2020, one day after the first case of COVID-19 was reported in the state, Carney declared a State of Delaware Due to a Public Health Threat State of Emergency for the State of Delaware Due to a Public Health Threat. He has issued a series of declarations in response to the COVID-19 pandemic in Delaware.

On May 24, 2022, Carney vetoed a bill to legalize possession of up to one ounce of marijuana by adults for recreational use, incurring the wrath of fellow Democrats who have fought for years to make cannabis legal.

Personal life
Carney married Tracey Quillen, daughter of Delaware Secretary of State William T. Quillen, on June 5, 1993. They have two children, Sam and Jimmy, who attended Wilmington Friends School. Sam Carney graduated from Clemson University, while Jimmy is a computer science major at Tufts University. In 2015 Sam Carney was named as one of a number of defendants in two separate lawsuits filed by the parents of Tucker Hipps, whose 2014 death allegedly occurred during a fraternity hazing incident. The lawsuit was settled in July 2017. Criminal charges have never been filed in the case despite there being no statute of limitations in South Carolina.
 
Carney's nephew is Minnesota Vikings offensive tackle Brian O'Neill.

Electoral history
Elections are held the first Tuesday after November 1. The lieutenant governor takes office the third Tuesday of January with a four-year term. U.S. Representatives take office January 3 and have a two-year term.

References

External links

Governor of Delaware official government website
John Carney for Governor campaign website

 

|-

|-

|-

|-

|-

|-
{{s-aft|after=Otherwise Kevin McCarthy
|-

1956 births
20th-century American politicians
21st-century American politicians
American people of Irish descent
Candidates in the 2008 United States elections
Dartmouth College alumni
Delaware Secretaries of Finance
Democratic Party members of the United States House of Representatives from Delaware
Democratic Party governors of Delaware
Lieutenant Governors of Delaware
Living people
People from Wilmington, Delaware
New Castle County, Delaware politicians